Vibyholm Castle is a manor house at Årdala, Flen Municipality, Sweden. The main building is located on an island in Lake Båven.

History
Vibyholm was built between 1622 and 1630 in Dutch High Renaissance style under design by Dutch architect Caspar van Panten (1585-1630). Restoration was made in 1798  following drawings by Swedish architect Carl Christoffer Gjörwell (1766-1837). In the middle of the 19th century, restoration to the house was undertaken under the direction of Swedish  architect Lars Jacob von Röök (1778-1867).

See also
List of castles in Sweden

References

External links
Wibyholms Godsförvaltning website

 Buildings and structures in Södermanland County